East Guldeford is a village and civil parish in the Rother district of East Sussex, England. The village is located one mile (1.6 km) east of Rye on the A259 road. The parish is controlled by a parish meeting. It is in the civil parish of Playden.
The parish church is dedicated to St Mary. It was consecrated in 1505.

References

External links

Villages in East Sussex
Civil parishes in East Sussex
Rother District